Gae Leila Magnafici (née Wycoff) (born July 14, 1952) is an American nurse and politician, currently serving in the Wisconsin State Assembly, representing Polk County and part of St. Croix County.  A Republican, she was first elected in 2018.

Biography
Magnafici was born in Amery, Polk County, Wisconsin, and raised on a farm in the neighboring community of Deronda.  She graduated from Amery High School and earned her Associate degree in Applied Science from Sauk Valley Community College in Dixon, Illinois.  She became a registered nurse in 1982.

Prior to receiving her RN certification, she worked for twelve years caring for developmentally disabled patients. Since that time, she worked for 35 years as a pediatric nurse, most recently at Children's Minnesota in Saint Paul, Minnesota, before retiring in 2017.

In 2018, she ran for Wisconsin State Assembly to replace Adam Jarchow, who was not seeking another term.  She was unopposed in the primary election and went on to defeat her Democratic opponent in the general election, carrying 59% of the votes.

In 2021, Magnafici proposed legislation to prevent the University of Wisconsin System and Wisconsin Technical College System from requiring on-campus students to be vaccinated or regularly tested against COVID-19 in order to access campus buildings.

Personal life and family
Gae is married to Thomas Magnafici, they reside and own a small business in Dresser, Wisconsin.  They have two adult children.

References

External links
 Gae Magnafici for Assembly
 Representative Gae Magnafici at Wisconsin Legislature
 
 

1952 births
Living people
People from Amery, Wisconsin
American women nurses
Women state legislators in Wisconsin
Republican Party members of the Wisconsin State Assembly
21st-century American politicians
21st-century American women politicians